The Symphony No. 1 or Symphony: 'Vigil' is an orchestral symphony by the Scottish composer James MacMillan.  It is the last of three interrelated compositions in MacMillan's Easter triptych Triduum commissioned by the London Symphony Orchestra.  The piece was first performed at the Barbican Centre on 28 September 1997 by the London Symphony Orchestra under the conductor Mstislav Rostropovich.

Composition

Background
The Symphony: 'Vigil' was the third of three pieces comprising MacMillan's Easter triptych Triduum, which also included the composer's oboe concerto The World's Ransoming and his Cello Concerto.  MacMillan described his inspiration for the symphony in the score program notes, writing:

Structure
The symphony has a duration of roughly 53 minutes and is composed in three movements:
Light
Tuba insonet salutaris
Water

Instrumentation
The work is scored for an orchestra comprising three flutes (3rd doubling piccolo), two oboes, cor anglais, two clarinets, bass clarinet, two bassoons, contrabassoon, four horns, three trumpets, three trombones, tuba, timpani, three percussionists, harp, piano (doubling celesta), and strings and a separate brass quintet comprising a horn, two trumpets, trombone, and tuba.

Reception
Arnold Whittall of Gramophone gave the symphony moderate praise, writing:
Reviewing the complete Triduum triptych, BBC Music Magazine similarly wrote:

See also
List of compositions by James MacMillan

References

Symphonies by James MacMillan
1997 compositions
MacMillan 1
Music commissioned by the London Symphony Orchestra